Le Vernet-Sainte-Marguerite is a commune in the Puy-de-Dôme department in Auvergne in central France.

Notable people

 Mathieu de Combarel de Leyval (1808–69), member of the National Assembly during the July Monarchy and the French Second Republic.

See also
Communes of the Puy-de-Dôme department

References

Vernetsaintemarguerite